Károly Győry (10 February 1910 – 24 December 1944) was a Hungarian rower.

Győry competed at the 1936 Summer Olympics in Berlin with the coxless pair alongside Tibor Mamusich where they came fourth. They also competed in the coxed pair, with László Molnár as coxswain, but they did not start in their semi-final race.

References

1910 births
1944 deaths
Hungarian male rowers
Olympic rowers of Hungary
Rowers at the 1936 Summer Olympics
Rowers from Budapest
European Rowing Championships medalists